Melvin Dixon (May 29, 1950 – October 26, 1992) was an American Professor of Literature, and an author, poet and translator. He wrote about black gay men.

Early life
Melvin Dixon was born on May 29, 1950 in Stamford, Connecticut. He earned a BA from Wesleyan University in 1971 and a PhD from Brown University in 1975.

Career

Dixon was a Professor of Literature at Queens College from 1980 to 1992. He was the author of several books. In 1989, Trouble the Water won the Charles H. and N. Mildred Nilon Excellence in Minority Fiction Award. Vanishing Rooms won a Ferro-Grumley Award for LGBT Literature in 1992.

Death
Dixon died of complications from AIDS, which he had been battling since 1989, in his hometown, one year after his partner Richard Horovitz did.

Bibliography

Collection of poems
Change of Territory (1983)
Love's Instruments (1995, posthumous)
Heartbeat

Textbooks
Ride Out the Wilderness: Geography and Identity in Afro-American Literature (1987)

Novels
Trouble the Water (1989)
Vanishing Rooms (1990)

Collection of essays
A Melvin Dixon Critical Reader (2010)

References

External links
Melvin Dixon profile and poems on Poets.org

1950 births
1992 deaths
20th-century American novelists
African-American academics
African-American novelists
African-American poets
American male novelists
Brown University alumni
American gay writers
LGBT African Americans
Writers from Stamford, Connecticut
Writers from New York City
Wesleyan University alumni
American LGBT poets
American LGBT novelists
LGBT people from Connecticut
20th-century American poets
American male poets
AIDS-related deaths in Connecticut
20th-century American male writers
Novelists from New York (state)
20th-century African-American writers
20th-century American LGBT people
African-American male writers
Gay poets